Hinckley Airport  is a privately owned, public-use airport located three nautical miles (6 km) west of the central business district of Hinckley, a village in DeKalb County, Illinois, United States.

Facilities and aircraft 
It has one runway designated 9/27 with a 2,640 by 100 ft (805 x 30 m) turf surface.

For the 12-month period ending August 31, 2019, the airport had 48,000 aircraft operations, an average of 131 per day, all of which were general aviation. At that time there were 35 aircraft based at this airport: 25 gliders and 10 airplanes, 9 single-engine and 1 multi-engine.

The airport does not have an FBO, and no fuel is available.

Accidents & Incidents 
On September 7, 1992, a Beechcraft 18 operating a skydiving flight crashed after taking off from Hinckley Airport. Witnesses reported seeing the plane flying low after takeoff and "floating as if it was without power." The plane soon flipped over and crashed. All 12 onboard died.

References

External links 

 Windy City Soaring Association at Hinckley Airport

Airports in Illinois
Gliding in the United States
Transportation buildings and structures in DeKalb County, Illinois